Smok'n Frolic (foaled  April 9th, 1999) is an American Thoroughbred racehorse and the winner of the Next Move Handicap.

Career

Smok'n Frolic's first race was on April 13, 2001, at Keeneland, where he came in fourth. She then won her next two races at Belmont Park, winning a Maiden Special Weight race and the 2001 Fashion Stakes

She raced in the Spinaway Stakes coming in 2nd, and picked up his first graded win at the 2001 Tempted Stakes. She followed that victory up with another win the following month at the 2001 Demoiselle Stakes.

She competed in multiple stakes races throughout 2002, but did not win any until she won the 2001 Cotillion Handicap in October. 

She started off 2003 with a January win at the Vessels Stallion Farm Distaff Stakes. She then picked up another graded win in March at the 2003 Next Move Handicap. She won the 2003  Turfway Breeders' Cup Stakes, which was the last win of her season.

Her final win took place on March 14, 2004, at the Next Move Handicap. She continued racing until she finished her career off with a 5th place finish at the Ballerina Handicap.

Pedigree

References

1999 racehorse births